Coelatura is a genus of bivalve in the Unionidae family.

Species
Species:

Coelatura aegyptiaca 
Coelatura alluaudi 
Coelatura bakeri 
Coelatura briarti 
Coelatura choziensis 
Coelatura cridlandi 
Coelatura disciformis 
Coelatura essoensis 
Coelatura gabonensis 
Coelatura gommeryi 
Coelatura hauttecoeuri 
Coelatura horei 
Coelatura hypsiprymna 
Coelatura hypsiprymna 
Coelatura kipopoensis 
Coelatura kunenensis 
Coelatura leopoldvillensis 
Coelatura lobensis 
Coelatura luapulaensis 
Coelatura madagascariensis 
Coelatura malgachensis 
Coelatura mossambicensis 
Coelatura ratidota 
Coelatura rothschildi 
Coelatura rotula 
Coelatura scholzi 
Coelatura stagnorum 
Coelatura stuhlmanni

See also
Coelatura L. Pfeiffer, 1877 is a synonym of Plegma Gude, 1911, a land snail.

References

Unionidae
Bivalve genera
Taxonomy articles created by Polbot